Yahya Michot (born Jean Michot) is a Belgian Muslim who is a professor of Islamic studies.

Background
Yahyah Michot was the president of the Higher Council of Muslims in Belgium from 1995 to 1998.

Yahyah Michot teaches at the Hartford Seminary, Connecticut as a professor of Islamic Studies and Christian-Muslim Relations. He is also the current editor of the journal "The Muslim World" edited by the Seminary.

Controversy
In 1997, under the pseudonym of Nasreddin Lebatelier, he published Le Statut des Moines from Lebanon.
This pamphlet included a translation of a short work by the famed 13th-14th century Muslim scholar Ibn Taymiyya, called On the Statute of Monks, which is read by some as a call for the killing of Christian monks if they are found outside their monasteries in a Muslim country. Lebatelier's introduction referred to the Algerian Armed Islamic Group's (GIA) killing of seven Trappist monks in Tibhirine in 1996. He analysed not only the GIA's justification for the killings but also the Muslim community's consensus (ijmâ') which condemned these assassinations, and explained the religious authoritativeness of such a consensus. He was nevertheless accused of having condoned the killing of the seven Trappists by Catholic authorities and media, notably by Marcel Crochet, the Rector of the Catholic University of Louvain where he was employed (June 26, 1997).

Michot negotiated his departure from the University of Louvain, which paid him a financial indemnity, including 50% of his lawyer's fees. Once appointed as the first Muslim lecturer of Islamic theology in Oxford, Michot faced renewed Catholic hostility, notably in various articles by Margaret Hebblethwaite in The Tablet (22 and 29 August 1998; 12 September 1998) and in an interview of the same activist on BBC 4, Sunday program (27 September 1998). Oxford nevertheless confirmed his appointment (Oxford University Gazette, 23 September 1999).

In England, Michot issued a statement which made clear that he had "never developed any kind of apology for murder" in his writings or statements. He "completely endorsed the condemnation of the GIA by the consensus of the Muslim community" and had always considered that "these killings were a particularly tragic event in Islamo−Christian relations".

However, in 2010, Michot, agreed with that the misprint of the Mardin fatwa resulted him that resulted him writing an erroneous analysis in Le Statut des Moines, and distanced himself from condoning any killings by jihadist groups. A Jesuit specialist of Ibn Taymiyya wrote to Michot in January 1999, "Your book is certainly not advocating murder, as I had been led to believe before I read it. I see your point, the case of the killing of the monks does present legal questions which are important for Muslims to address."

Works
IBN SÎNÂ. Lettre au vizir Abû Sa'd", 2000;
"AVICENNE. Réfutation de l'astrologie" , 2000;
Ibn Taymiyya: Muslims under non-Muslim Rule (2006), 
Ahmad al-Aqhisârî: Against Smoking. An Ottoman Manifesto,2010;
Musulmans en Europe, (2002).

See also
Le Statut des Moines

References

External links
 Ibn Taymiyya. Le statut des moines. Yahya Michot.
 .
 Islam y Monaquismo
 L’affaire Le Batelier. Philippe Van Parijs.
 Jihad from Qur'an to Bin Laden. Richard Bonney, p. 122.

Belgian writers in French
Converts to Islam
21st-century Muslim scholars of Islam
Belgian Muslims
Living people
Year of birth missing (living people)